The Rumsen language (also known as Rumsien, San Carlos Costanoan and Carmeleno) is one of eight Ohlone languages, historically spoken by the Rumsen people of Northern California. The Rumsen language was spoken from the Pajaro River to Point Sur, and on the lower courses of the Pajaro, as well as on the Salinas and Carmel Rivers, and the region of the present-day cities of Salinas, Monterey and Carmel.

History 
One of eight languages within the Ohlone branch of the Utian family, it became one of two important native languages spoken at the Mission San Carlos Borroméo de Carmelo founded in 1770, the other being the Esselen language.

The last fluent speaker of Rumsen was Isabel Meadows, who died in 1939. The Bureau of American Ethnology linguist John Peabody Harrington conducted very extensive fieldwork with Meadows in the last several years of her life. These notes, still mostly unpublished, now constitute the foundation for current linguistic research and revitalization efforts on the Rumsen language. The Costanoan Rumsen Carmel Tribe has been in the process of reestablishing their language. They have begun efforts to teach their tribal members Rumsen and are working to complete a revised English - Rumsen Dictionary.

Rumsen-speaking tribes
Dialects of the Rumsen language were spoken by four independent local tribes, including the Rumsen themselves, the Ensen of the Salinas vicinity, the Calendaruc of the central shoreline of Monterey Bay, and the Sargentaruc of the Big Sur Coast. The territory of the language group was bordered by Monterey Bay and the Pacific Ocean to the west, the Awaswas Ohlone to the north, the Mutsun Ohlone to the east, the Chalon Ohlone on the south east, and the Esselen to the south.

Phonology

See also
 Ohlone tribes and villages in the Monterey Bay Area
 Abalone

Notes

References

 Breschini, Gary S. and Trudy Haversat. 1994. Rumsen Seasonality and Population Dynamics. In The Ohlone Past and Present, pp. 183–197, Lowell J. Bean, editor. Menlo Park, CA: Ballena Press.
 Hackel, Steven W. 2005. Children of Coyote, Missionaries of Saint Francis: Indian-Spanish Relations in Colonial California, 1769-1850. University of North Carolina Press. 
 Hinton, Leanne. 2001. The Ohlone Languages, in The Green Book of Language Revitalization in Practice, pp. 425–432. Emerald Group Publishing .
 Kroeber, Alfred L. 1925. Handbook of the Indians of California. Washington, D.C: Bureau of American Ethnology Bulletin No. 78. (map of villages, page 465)
 Levy, Richard. 1978. Costanoan, in Handbook of North American Indians, Vol. 8 (California). William C. Sturtevant, and Robert F. Heizer, eds. Washington, DC: Smithsonian Institution, 1978.  / 0160045754, pages 485–495.
 Milliken, Randall. 1987. Ethnohistory of the Rumsen. Papers in Northern California Anthropology No. 2. Salinas, CA: Coyote Press.
 Teixeira, Lauren. The Costanoan/Ohlone Indians of the San Francisco and Monterey Bay Area, A Research Guide. Menlo Park, CA: Ballena Press Publication, 1997. .

External links
Costanoan Rumsen Chino Tribe
Ohlone Costanoan Esselen Nation Tribal Website

Spanish-Rumsen-Esselen Glossary, 1802

Ohlone languages
Extinct languages of North America
Salinas Valley
History of Monterey County, California